
This is a timeline of Austrian history, comprising important legal and territorial changes and political events in Austria and its predecessor states.  To read about the background to these events, see History of Austria.

 Centuries: 10th11th12th13th14th15th16th17th18th19th20th21st

10th century

11th century

12th century

13th century

14th century

15th century

16th century

17th century

18th century

19th century

20th century

21st century

References 

Austria
Austria history-related lists